The statue of Queen Victoria in Frere Hall, Karachi, Pakistan, is a work by the sculptor Sir Hamo Thornycroft. The statue was removed in 1962 on the order of president from Frere Hall.

It is now housed in Mohatta Palace, Karachi.

History
The statue was commissioned in 1902 at a cost of £6,000. It was shipped in 1905 and installed by the King George V.

The statue was made by sculptor Hamo Thornycroft with marble. The statue remained in Frere Hall. In 1962, it was removed by order of then-president Ayub Khan.

See also
 List of statues of Queen Victoria

References

1902 establishments in British India
1902 sculptures
Monuments and memorials in Karachi
Statues of Queen Victoria